Władysław Pasikowski (born 14 June 1959 in Łódź, Poland) is a Polish film director and screenwriter.

He made his debut film, Kroll, in 1991, which was honored with the Polish Film Festival prize for his debut and the Special Jury Prize. 
Pasikowski is also the author of the science fiction novel I, Gelerth (Ja, Gelerth (Zebra)) which in 1993 was nominated for the Janusz A. Zajdel Award.

Filmography
 Kroll (1991)
 Psy (1992)
 Psy II: Ostatnia krew (1994)
 Słodko gorzki (1996)
 Demons of War (1998)
 Operacja Samum (1999)
 Reich (2001)
 Glina (2003–2004)
 Maszyna losująca (2007)
 Aftermath (2012) The story is loosely based on a pogrom which took place in Jedwabne in German-occupied north eastern Poland in July 1941. Two brothers attempt "to break the conspiracy of silence among the residents of the village where the massacre had taken place". Starring Maciej Stuhr as Jozek. Met with negative commentary alleging fabrications and anti-polonism, which in turn led to allegations of anti-semitism of its critics, and praise for the director and actor for approaching the topic in Poland when it opened.
 Jack Strong (2014) about Ryszard Kukliński
 Pitbull. Ostatni pies (2018)
 Kurier (2019) about Jan Nowak-Jeziorański
 Psy 3 (2020)

References

External links
 
 Władysław Pasikowski at filmpolski.pl (in Polish).
 Sylwetka na stronie Studia Filmowego ZEBRA
 Władysław Pasikowski at Stopklatka (in Polish).
 z bazy filmweb
 Biography at culture.pl
 Władysław Pasikowski - Aftermath

1959 births
Living people
Łódź Film School alumni
Polish film directors
Polish screenwriters
Polish science fiction writers
Film people from Łódź
University of Łódź alumni